Wayne Black and Sandon Stolle were the defending champions, but none competed this year. Black focused on the singles tournament.

Jiří Novák and David Rikl won the title by defeating Robbie Koenig and Peter Tramacchi 6–2, 7–5 in the final.

Seeds

Draw

Draw

References
 Official Results Archive (ATP)
 Official Results Archive (ITF)

2000 ATP Tour
2000 Dubai Tennis Championships